Alex "Tattie" Marshall  (born 8 February 1967) is record breaking Scottish bowls player.

Marshall plays at Gifford Bowls Club (outdoor) and East Lothian Indoor Bowling Club. Marshall began bowling at the age of eight supported by both his father and grandfather and first represented his country in 1988.

He is a record breaking six-time World Indoor Singles Champion. He has eight World Indoor Pairs titles to his credit (six Open Pairs and two Mixed Pairs). Marshall has won seven World Outdoor Championship Gold medals (Pairs in 1992, 2000 and 2012, Fours in 1992, and Team in 1992, 1996 and 2004).

His other achievements include four Commonwealth Games Gold medals (Pairs in 2002, 2006 and 2014, and Fours in 2014), one Atlantic Games Team Gold (in 2015), and three Hong Kong International Classic Pairs titles (in 1993, 1996 and 2002).

In 2012, Marshall and Paul Foster became the first pair to win the World Indoor and Outdoor Pairs titles in the same year. In 2013, he claimed his first major WBT title outside the World Indoor title at the UK International Open. In 2014, he won the Australian Premier League with the Murray Steamers and was named Most Valuable Player at the end of the season. Marshall would also offer a challenge to Short mat bowls players from England, Scotland, Wales, and Ireland aiming to defeat them in a game of short mat bowls. Marshall would defeat Scotland's Lawrence Moffat and Wales' Ceri Jones; but would lose to Wales' multiple time world champion Steven Williams, and Irelands Dessie Hamilton. In the rubber match, he would draw against England's Dominic Reed. However, Reed would win the game's extra end.

In 2016, two more bronze medals were added when he competed in the 2016 World Outdoor Bowls Championship in Christchurch. He added a pairs silver as part of the Scottish team for the 2018 Commonwealth Games with Paul Foster. He then set a gold medal record for Scotland by winning the gold medal in the Fours with Ronnie Duncan, Derek Oliver and Paul Foster.

The success continued in 2019 when he won another open pairs at the 2019 World Indoor Bowls Championship, this was a fourth with Paul Foster and sixth in total. This was his 14th World indoor gold medal.

In 2020 he was selected for the 2020 World Outdoor Bowls Championship in Australia. In 2022, he competed in the men's pairs and the men's fours at the 2022 Commonwealth Games. Partnering Foster, they won the pairs bronze medal.

Marshall was appointed a Member of the Order of the British Empire (MBE) in the 2007 New Year Honours for services to bowls.

World Indoor Performance timeline

Men's Doubles partners = 2000 - 2003 David Gourlay, 2004 - 2017 & 2019 Paul Foster, 2018 Neil Furman 
Mixed Doubles partners = 2004 Amy Monkhouse, 2006 Laura Hawryszko, 2007 Alison Merrien, 2008 Caroline Brown, 2009 Debbie Stavrou, 2010 - 2011 Carol Ashby, 2012 Janice Gower, 2014 Alison Merrien, 2015 - 2016 Julie Forrest.

References

1967 births
Living people
People from Tranent
Scottish male bowls players
Bowls players at the 2002 Commonwealth Games
Bowls players at the 2006 Commonwealth Games
Bowls players at the 2014 Commonwealth Games
Bowls players at the 2018 Commonwealth Games
Bowls players at the 2022 Commonwealth Games
Sportspeople from East Lothian
Commonwealth Games gold medallists for Scotland
Commonwealth Games medallists in lawn bowls
Bowls World Champions
Members of the Order of the British Empire
Indoor Bowls World Champions
Medallists at the 2002 Commonwealth Games
Medallists at the 2006 Commonwealth Games
Medallists at the 2014 Commonwealth Games
Medallists at the 2018 Commonwealth Games
Medallists at the 2022 Commonwealth Games